Kurush (formerly: Kurkat) is a village and jamoat in north-western Tajikistan. It is identified with the ancient town Cyropolis that was founded by the Persian king Cyrus the Great. It is located in Spitamen District in Sughd Region. The jamoat has a total population of 30,469 (2019).

References

Populated places in Sughd Region
Jamoats of Tajikistan